Jonas Bering (born 9 November 1975) is a French electronic music songwriter, from Lille, France. Jonas Bering emerged from the techno scene of Cologne, Germany, through his works released on the German label Kompakt, run by Wolfgang Voigt, Michael Mayer and Juergen Paape.

Selected discography
Bienfait (CD, Album), Kompakt (2000)
Emballages (12", Kompakt (2000)
From The Nape Of The Neck (12"), Logarythm (2001)
Marine (12"), Kompakt (2002)
Normandie (12"), Kompakt (2003)
Sketches For The Next Season (12", CD, Album), Kompakt (2003)
Diva (12"), Defrag Sound Processing (2004)
Behind This Silence (12"), Kompakt (2006)
Lost Paradise (12"), Kompakt (2006)
Cityscape (12"), Kupei Musika (2007) w/Kate Simko
Can't Stop Loving You (12"), Kompakt (2008) w/ Aubelia Petit
Behind The Silence (CD, Album), Klik Records/Kompakt (2008)

External links
Jonas Bering official site
Jonas Bering at Discogs

French musicians
1975 births
Living people